Chilobrycon deuterodon is a species of characin endemic to the Tumbes River on the Pacific slope of northern Peru.   It is the only member of the genus Chilobrycon.  It can be found in fresh water at pelagic depths. This species is native to a tropical climate.  
C. deuteron can reach about 10.8 cm (4.2 in) in length.

References

Characidae
Monotypic ray-finned fish genera
Fish of South America
Fish of Peru
Taxa named by Jacques Géry
Taxa named by Patrick de Rham
Fish described in 1981